Torge and Torger is a masculine given name.

Torge 

 Torge Hollmann (born 1982), German footballer
 Torge Schmidt (born 1988), German politician
 Torge Paetow (born 1995), German footballer

Torger 

 Torger Christian Wolf (born 1972), Austrian billionaire motorsport executive
 Torger Reve (born 1949), Norwegian economist
 Torger Juve (born 1840), Norwegian-born American politician
 Torger Ødegaard (born 1966), Norwegian politician
 Torger Baardseth(1875–1947), Norwegian bookseller and publisher
 Torger Hovi (1905–1980), Norwegian politician
 Torger Nergård (born 1974), Norwegian curler
 Torger G. Thompson (1853–1923), American politician
 Torger Motland (born 1985), Norwegian football striker
 Torger Holtsmark (1863–1926), Norwegian farmer and politician
 Torger Tokle (1919–1945 , Norwegian-born American ski jumper and military officer
 Torger Hougen, American musician

See also 

 Torg

Masculine given names
German masculine given names
Norwegian masculine given names